Dmitri Tolstenkov (born 3 November 1973 in Donetsk) is a Ukrainian former track cyclist. He won a silver medal in the team pursuit at the 1995 UCI Track Cycling World Championships.

References

External links

1973 births
Living people
Ukrainian male cyclists
Ukrainian track cyclists
Sportspeople from Donetsk